Catocala repudiata is a moth of the family Erebidae first described by Otto Staudinger in 1888. It is found in western Turkestan and Xinjiang.

References

Moths described in 1888
repudiata
Moths of Asia